WAWI may refer to:

William Alanson White Institute
Women At Work International, NGO based in Uganda
WAWI (FM), a radio station (89.7 FM) licensed to Lawrenceburg, Tennessee, United States

See also 
 Wawi, a village in Thailand